The 2019 Western Kentucky Hilltoppers football team (WKU) represented Western Kentucky University in the 2019 NCAA Division I FBS football season. The Hilltoppers played their home games at the Houchens Industries–L. T. Smith Stadium in Bowling Green, Kentucky, as members of the East Division of Conference USA (C–USA). They were led by first-year head coach Tyson Helton.

Previous season
The Hilltoppers finished the 2018 season 3–9, 2–6 in C–USA play to finish in a tie for sixth place in the East Division.

Preseason

Award watch lists
Listed in the order that they were released

Preseason media poll
The preseason poll was released prior to the Conference USA media days on July 17–18, 2019. The Hilltoppers were predicted to finish in fifth place in the C–USA East Division.

Preseason All–Conference USA teams
2019 Preseason All-Conference USA

Schedule

Game summaries

Central Arkansas

at FIU

vs. Louisville

UAB

at Old Dominion

Army

Charlotte

at Marshall

Florida Atlantic

at Arkansas

at Southern Miss

Middle Tennessee

vs. Western Michigan (First Responder Bowl)

References

Western Kentucky
Western Kentucky Hilltoppers football seasons
First Responder Bowl champion seasons
Western Kentucky Hilltoppers football